Arius oetik is a species of sea catfish in the family Ariidae. It was described by Pieter Bleeker in 1846. It is known from tropical marine and brackish waters in the western Pacific. Its diet consists of mussels, flathead locust lobsters, shrimp, conger eels, ponyfish, squids and Indian mackerels.

References

oetik
Taxa named by Pieter Bleeker
Fish described in 1846